German submarine U-239 was a Type VIIC U-boat of Nazi Germany's Kriegsmarine during World War II.

The submarine was laid down on 14 May 1942 at the Friedrich Krupp Germaniawerft yard at Kiel as yard number 669, launched on 28 January 1943 and commissioned on 13 March under the command of Leutnant zur See Ulrich Vöge.

After training with the 5th U-boat Flotilla at Kiel, she went to the 22nd flotilla as a 'school' boat and then back to the fifth flotilla.

She was damaged in Kiel by British bombs on 24 July 1944 and broken up in the same year.

Design
German Type VIIC submarines were preceded by the shorter Type VIIB submarines. U-239 had a displacement of  when at the surface and  while submerged. She had two shafts and two  propellers.

U-239 was fitted with five  torpedo tubes (four fitted at the bow and one at the stern), fourteen torpedoes, one  SK C/35 naval gun, 220 rounds, and two twin  C/30 anti-aircraft guns. The boat had a complement of between forty-four and sixty.

Fate
She was damaged in a British air raid at the Germania Werke in Kiel on 24 July 1944 which also killed one crewman, she was then broken up later that same year.

References

Bibliography

External links

German Type VIIC submarines
World War II submarines of Germany
U-boats commissioned in 1943
U-boats sunk in 1944
1942 ships
Ships built in Kiel
U-boats sunk by British aircraft
Maritime incidents in July 1944